Dongmolla is a harvestman genus in the family Assamiidae, with only 1 described species - Dongmolla silvestrii.

See also
 List of Assamiidae species

Harvestmen